Hopen is an island in the southeastern part of the Svalbard archipelago (Norway). Hopen was discovered in 1596 by Jan Cornelisz Rijp during the third expedition by Willem Barentsz, trying to find the Northeast Passage.
Later, in 1613, its name was given by Thomas Marmaduke of Hull, who named it after his former command, the Hopewell.

The Norwegian Meteorological Institute operates a staffed weather station on the island with a staff of four persons. For the welfare of the crew, there are three cabins available on the island for their use.

During World War II, the Luftwaffe placed a meteorological team there under cover of Operation Zitronella.

On August 28, 1978 an early model Tupolev Tu-16 of the Soviet Air Force crashed on the island. All seven crew were killed in the accident. It was discovered two days later by the four-man Norwegian weather forecasting team. The USSR refused to admit the loss of an aircraft until the bodies of the crew were given to them. Norway transcribed the contents of the flight recorder over the objections of the Soviet government.

Environment
A significant number of polar bears are found at Hopen in the winter; moreover, the sub-population of Ursus maritimus found here is a genetically distinct taxon of polar bears associated with the Barents Sea region.

Important Bird Area
The island has been identified as an Important Bird Area (IBA) by BirdLife International. It supports breeding populations of black-legged kittiwakes (40,000 pairs), thick-billed guillemots (150,000 individuals) and black guillemots (1000 pairs).

Climate
Hopen has a tundra climate (Köppen climate classification ET).

Gallery

See also
 List of islands of Norway

References

Bibliography
 C. Michael Hogan (2008) Polar Bear: Ursus maritimus, Globaltwitcher.com, ed. Nicklas Stromberg
 Oysten Wiig and Kjell Isaksen Seasonal Distribution of Harbour Seals, Bearded Seals, White Whales and Polar Bears in the Barents Sea

External links 
 Norwegian Meteorological Institute: About Hopen Island
  Hopen weather data at met.no

 
Islands of Svalbard
Nature reserves in Svalbard
Important Bird Areas of Svalbard
Seabird colonies
Ramsar sites in Norway